Niederwenigern is a small borough of the city of Hattingen in North Rhine-Westphalia, Germany. It is situated on the river Ruhr, 4 km east of Kupferdreh (a borough of Essen) and 3 km west of the center of Hattingen. The population is about 6,000 and before 1926, it was an independent municipality. Niederwenigern has a large 19th-century Roman Catholic church, the St. Mauritius Church. There is also a Lutheran-Evangelical Protestant church. There is also a museum dedicated to Nikolaus Groß, a Catholic and trade union resistance fighter in the time of the Third Reich. 

Niederwenigern has two kindergartens, two primary schools and some smaller shops for daily needs. Famous is the yearly "Mauritius Kirmes", a typical small fun fair celebrated at the end of September in relation to the saint's day of St. Mauritius. Its popularity is founded in the fact that a lot of (former) residents come back to Niederwenigern at this weekend to meet old friends. The fair lasts three days (Saturday through Monday). 

Ennepe-Ruhr-Kreis